Rausch Creek is a populated place in Schuylkill County, Pennsylvania in the United States.

References

Populated places in Schuylkill County, Pennsylvania